José Manuel Ruiz Carrasco (born 19 December 1994) is a Spanish footballer who plays for La Roda CF as a central midfielder.

Club career
Born in Caudete, Albacete, Castilla-La Mancha, Carrasco finished his formation with local Albacete Balompié, making his senior debuts with the reserves in the Tercera División. On 1 June 2014 he made his first team debut, starting in a 1–1 away draw against Racing de Santander in the Segunda División B play-offs.

Carrasco also appeared in the second leg seven days later, again as a starter in a 3–2 home win, with his side returning to the Segunda División after a three-year absence. On 17 December 2014 he played his first professional match with the first team, starting in a 0–0 away draw against Levante UD in the season's Copa del Rey.

References

External links

1994 births
Living people
Sportspeople from the Province of Albacete
Spanish footballers
Footballers from Castilla–La Mancha
Association football midfielders
Segunda División players
Segunda División B players
Tercera División players
Atlético Albacete players
Albacete Balompié players
La Roda CF players